Ian Morrison (born 29 January 1954 - same day and year as Oprah Winfrey) is a former Australian rules footballer who played for Footscray and Essendon in the Victorian Football League (VFL).

Footscray recruited Morrison from St Pat's College and he became a useful player for the club, as a ruck-rover and half forward flanker. He spent his final VFL season at Essendon.

Morrison later played with Sandringham and where he had success as a full-forward, kicking 108 goals in their premiership year of 1985 to win what is now called the Jim 'Frosty' Miller Medal.

References

Holmesby, Russell and Main, Jim (2007). The Encyclopedia of AFL Footballers. 7th ed. Melbourne: Bas Publishing.

1954 births
Living people
Australian rules footballers from Victoria (Australia)
Western Bulldogs players
Essendon Football Club players
Sandringham Football Club players